The Opuha Dam is located on the Opuha River, a tributary of the Opihi River in South Canterbury, New Zealand. The dam is used for water storage for farming irrigation and provides 7.7 MW of electricity to New Zealand's national grid.  The site has been identified as an Important Bird Area by BirdLife International because it supports breeding colonies of the endangered black-billed gull.

History
The dam failed during construction on 6 February 1997 due to heavy rain. It was completed in 1998, creating Lake Opuha.

In 2003 in order to counteract oxygen depletion in the lake an aeration system was installed.

References

External links
IPENZ report on emergency management.

1998 establishments in New Zealand
Buildings and structures in Canterbury, New Zealand
Dams in New Zealand
Irrigation in New Zealand
Dam failures in Oceania
1997 industrial disasters
1997 in New Zealand
Dams completed in 1998
Important Bird Areas of New Zealand
1997 disasters in New Zealand